FC Vastseliina is an Estonian football club based in Vastseliina. Founded in 2008, they currently play in the III liiga, the fifth tier of Estonian football. Vastseliina Gümnaasiumi jalgpalliväljak is their home stadium.

Players

Current squad
 ''As of 23 May 2017.

Statistics

League and Cup

References

Vastseliina
Association football clubs established in 2008
2008 establishments in Estonia